"Grace / Ride The Storm" is the fourth and final single released from Blue band-member Simon Webbe's second solo album, Grace. Although Ride The Storm only features on the SEA Special Edition of Grace, the song served as the official theme from the soundtrack to the 2007 sci-fi film, Fantastic Four: Rise of the Silver Surfer. The double A-side peaked at #36 on the UK Singles Chart. The single was not released in Europe - instead, Seventeen, another track from Grace, was released. Music videos for both tracks were filmed, Grace featuring Webbe performing on a high-rise building on a council estate, and Ride The Storm featuring clips of the Fantastic Four film intertwinned with clips of Webbe performing in a superhero-style outfit.

Track listing
 UK CD Single
 "Grace" (Single Version) - 3:24
 "Ride The Storm" (Radio Edit) - 2:45

 UK Promo Single
 "Ride The Storm" (Full Version) - 3:44

Charts

References

2007 singles
Simon Webbe songs
Songs written by Matt Prime
Songs written by Simon Webbe
Songs written by Tim Woodcock